M'jid El Guerrab (born 25 April 1983) is a French politician of the Radical Movement (MR) who served as a member of the National Assembly since 19 June 2017, representing the 9th district of French people living abroad, which includes the Maghreb and part of West Africa.

Early life
El Guerrab, the son of Moroccan immigrants, was born on 25 April 1983 in Aurillac.

Political career
El Guerrab joined the Socialist Party at the age of 14. From 2006, he worked on the staff of Ségolène Royal.

In parliament, El Guerrab served on the Defence Committee (2017-2018) and the Finance Committee (2017-2019) before moving to the Committee on Foreign Affairs.

In addition to his committee assignments, El Guerrab is part of the French parliamentary friendship groups with Burkina Faso, Liberia and Mali.

After he was indicted in September 2017, El Guerrab was threatened with expulsion from LREM and subsequently announced his departure from the party.

Controversy
In September 2017, El Guerrab was detained by police after a fight with Socialist Party lawmaker Boris Faure; Faure was hospitalized after El Guerrab hit him with a motorcycle helmet. In 2022 he was sentenced to 3 years in prison for the assault.

References

External links
 National Assembly biography

1983 births
Living people
21st-century French politicians
Deputies of the 15th National Assembly of the French Fifth Republic
La République En Marche! politicians
French people of Moroccan descent
People from Aurillac
Sciences Po Aix alumni
French politicians convicted of crimes
Members of Parliament for French people living outside France